Kilkenny Airport  is an airport located  west of Kilkenny in County Kilkenny, Ireland. The aerodrome was founded in 1963 by John Hehir, Martin Mulhall, Patrick Nolan and Edward Stallard. All founding members were active pilots and natives of Kilkenny.

The aerodrome was first licensed by the Department of Transport and Power on 30 April 1965. The aerodrome has remained licensed each year since first licence issue. The current licence holder is Irish Skydiving Club Limited. The aerodrome consisted originally of two grass runways, but in 1976, this was reduced to a single runway (09/27) and the main runway was extended to 930 meters.

There is a parachute club and flying club based at the aerodrome and the aerodrome facilitates private domestic aircraft and private international flights, mainly from the UK. There are a number of private light aircraft based at the aerodrome. Kilkenny Airport is also home to the Kinair Air Rally, which ran every year for 25 years.

Kilkenny Airport was funded each year by Kilkenny County Council from 1976 to 2007. These funds assisted with the development of the airport and subsidised the operating costs of the airport.

In the Cabin Pressure episode Uskerty, Kilkenny airport is the destination of a fictional flight.

References

External links
 

Airports in the Republic of Ireland
Transport in County Kilkenny